AFC Ajax Amateurs or Ajax Zaterdag  (English: Ajax Saturday) is a Dutch amateur football club and the amateur team of the professional club AFC Ajax from Amsterdam. They compete in the Hoofdklasse since 2022–23, playing their home matches at the Sportpark De Toekomst training grounds.

Club history
AFC Ajax Amateurs, better known as Ajax Zaterdag is a Dutch amateur football club founded 18 March 1900. It is the amateur team of the professional club AFC Ajax from Amsterdam, who play their home matches at the Sportpark De Toekomst training grounds to a capacity of 5,000. The team was promoted from the Eerste Klasse to the Hoofdklasse ahead of the 2011–12 season. The team has won the Eerste Klasse title twice, as well as the *KNVB District Cup West I on two occasions as well.

Following the 2013–14 Hoofdklasse season, the team was promoted to the Topklasse leading to the top tiered teams of the Amsterdam club to compete in the top three tiers of professional football in the Netherlands, AFC Ajax (Eredivisie), Jong Ajax (Eerste Divisie) and Ajax Zaterdag (Topklasse). After one season the team finished 14th and relegated back to the Hoofdklasse.

Current squad

Current squad as of 1 August 2020

Current staff
Technical staff
Manager: Bart Logchies
Assistant manager: Dennis van der Wal
Assistant manager: Detlef Le Grand

Medical staff
Physiotherapist: Mohamed Oumouh
Physiotherapist: Thomas Hamersma
Physiotherapist: Frank van Deursen
Fitness coach / Recovery trainer: Björn Rekelhof

Accompanying staff
Team manager: Jan Fleijsman
Players supervisor: Dick Goossens
Materials manager: Rob Versluis
Assistant referee: Stephan Tulleners
Secretary: Marjon van Nielen

Honours

Club 
Eerste Klasse A (2): 2003, 2012
Tweede Klasse C (1): 1993
Derde Klasse B (1): 1992
Vierde Klasse C (1): 1990
Hoofdklasse AVB Zaterdag (1): 1989
Eerste Klasse A AVB Zaterdag (1): 1988
Eerste Klasse D AVB Zaterdag (1): 1987
Eerste Klasse C AVB Zaterdag (1): 1990
KNVB District Cup West I (2): 2005, 2008
 Promotion to Topklasse: 2014
 Promotion to Eerste Klasse: 1995
 Placement for KNVB Cup: 2004, 2005, 2008, 2021
 Promotion to Derde Divisie: 2018
(Source)

References

External links 
 Website of the Ajax Amateurs

 
Association football clubs established in 1900
Football clubs in the Netherlands
Football clubs in Amsterdam
1900 establishments in the Netherlands